Bhargama is a Community development block and a town in district of Araria, in Bihar state of India. It is one out of 3 blocks of Forbesganj subdivision. The headquarter of the block is at Bhargama town.

The block is divided into many Village Councils and villages.

Administration and politics
Narpatganj (Vidhan Sabha constituency) is the assembly constituency for the block. Jai Prakash Yadav (BJP) elected in 2020 is the MLA.

Gram Panchayats
There are many gram panchayats of Bhargama block in Forbesganj subdivision, Araria district.

Education
Jawahar High school is located in the block.

See also
Administration in Bihar

References

Community development blocks in Araria district